"Mutual credit" (sometimes called "multilateral barter" or "credit clearing") is a term mostly used in the field of complementary currencies to describe a common, usually small-scale, endogenous money system. 

The term implies that creditors and debtors are the same people lending to each other, but there are several nuances. Some think of mutual credit as a type of currency but this can be problematic because no currency or money is 'issued' in the sense that most people would understand it. Cash is very rarely 'issued', accounting normally taking place on a ledger, therefore it could also be called 'ledger money', a money system,  accounting for exchange or credit clearing system. The accounting is explained under multilateral exchange.

Economics
The practice of multilateral exchange can be a mere convenience, but once a common unit of account is agreed, the extent to which members can draw credit limited, a mutual credit system quickly resembles a money system. However, mutual credit is not one of the recognised schools of economic thought.

Even so, Keynes proposed a mutual credit system called International Clearing Union instead of a gold standard, but it was rejected.

The ideas can, however, be found in mutualism, which does value equitable exchange and cooperation.

Characteristics

Sufficiency
In the mainstream economy, money is regarded as a scarce commodity, which is rented out many times simultaneously by those who have it, to those who don't. This practice leads directly to hoarding and thus scarcity of money, to a growing wealth gap, to the poverty trap, the boom/bust cycle, the economic 'growth imperative' and many other seemingly eternal social evils.

Mutual credit accounting emphasises the importance of balanced exchange over the importance of property owners getting something for nothing. 
When every credit is matched by an equal and opposite debt, which is to say when there is no money and no interest, then supply equals demand a priori, and all the problems of economic equilibrium go away.

Elasticity of the money supply
Similarly, the very politicised question of the size of the money supply is solved because the credit is perfectly elastic; it is available in whatever quantity the debtor is trusted to repay. Without interest on deposits, there is no reason to hoard credit – all credit is treated as a short-term loan between trusted partners, though many systems make provision for default similar to insurance.

Decentralisation
The implication of mutual credit is that anyone can access credit to the extent to which they are trusted to repay. This can be contrasted to commercial credit systems in which only banks can 'issue' credit. Similarly the risk of default is spread differently.

Seignorage
In a fiat money system the benefits of issuing money fall to the sovereign who can spend money out of nothing. In a commercial credit system the interest from lending money out of nothing falls to the bank. In a mutual credit system, there is no seignorage mechanism, and no interest.

Inflation
Since the money supply is elastic, the problem of inflation (too much money in too small economy) should never happen in a mutual credit, and if it does, it indicates a failure of governance. Some systems allow the 'house' account unlimited spending, and this destroys the equilibrium, resulting either in inflation, or in recession.

Access to credit
Depending on the meaning of 'mutual' a mutual credit economy might imply that the people who give value to the money decide which endeavours deserve the privilege of credit.

Symmetry
In conventional money systems there are considerable ethical concerns around lending and borrowing. A comparison of punishments meted out to the troika for loan sharking and the punishment to the Greek government for defaulting on interest repayments shows that in modern times the political and moral superiority of creditors over debtors is near absolute.

Every transaction involves one person extending credit to another, there is a necessary moral equivalence of creditors and debtors. Similarly, just as in banking, credit is limited to the degree to which the account-holder is trusted, in mutual credit, debit is often also limited to the degree to which the account holder is trusted to spend back to zero. In mainstream economics high bank balances are rewarded (with interest), but the celebrated members of mutual credit systems are both earning and spending.

Governance of mutual credit systems
Mutual credit governance relies on trust. With no trust, there is no credit and therefore no transactions. But too much trust may be abused by members who are less serious about closing their accounts on zero - exactly the same as a Credit bubble. Small and egalitarian systems usually grant every account the same (positive and) negative limits. Some small systems will have a 'house' account which is collectively governed and may have greater limits. Larger systems with less trust between members, greater diversity of members or whose members' livelihoods depend on reciprocation have credit rating systems of more or less elaborate design.

An addition governance question concerns privacy. What transactions are visible to whom, and what account balances are visible to whom?

Meaning of 'mutual'
Practitioners and theoreticians in the complementary currency movement do not use the term in a consistent way. 'Credit' implies that something is owed, yet many community currencies using this framing do not attempt to enforce debt.  Meanwhile the implication of 'mutual' is rarely discussed. It could mean that

 creditors and debts are the same people at different times
 default risk is shared between all members of the circle (not necessarily distributed equally or even in a managed way)
 credit allocation is decided in a participative forum.
Ripple has also been described as mutual credit, even though credit is extended unilaterally (from one account to another), and might not be reciprocated.

Is mutual credit 'money'?
Money is much more than a record of what we have spent and earned. Though the definition of money itself is highly contentious, it is usually important that it be generally exchanged for useful things. What makes a mutual credit accounting system, into something like a money system is the contractual obligation of account holders to close all accounts at zero, which is to say, to depart the system neither owing nor owed.
The credit theory of money says clearly that money does not need to be, or be backed by, commodities like gold. Mutual credit systems can perform, reasonably well, all of the three classical functions of money, as store of value, medium of exchange and unit of account. And while some heterodox economists such as Silvio Gesell argue that money should not even be used as a store of value, as a medium of exchange, mutual credit is unrivalled:
 it actually records how much value has been given and how much received,
 it is more readily available when needed (it doesn't have to be mined and refined first),
 moving 'credit' is simply a matter of adding a ledger entry,
 it provides an incentive for members to help each other exchange (see below),
Note that since mutual credit transactions do not involve the movement of a commodity, are by nature both traceable and reversible, in contrast to say, cash or Bitcoin.

Examples and types of systems
There are three main social institutions said to use mutual credit today, trade exchanges, local exchange trading systems, and timebanking associations, each with a number of offshoots and variations, and their own understanding of what mutual credit means.

See also
Barter exchange
Multilateral exchange
Mutualism, a theory of anarchism which favors mutual credit banking
Savings pools are ways for mutually trusting groups to lend money to each other
WIR Bank
Collaborative finance
Inside money
Credit Services - a UK-based startup startup specialising in local economy design.

References

Mutualism (movement)
Alternative currencies
Anarchist theory
Monetary reform